Ben D. Hughes (October 24, 1878 – April 4, 1947) was an American farmer and politician.

Hughes was born in Iowa and moved to Minnesota in 1888. He lived in New Ulm, Blue Earth County, Minnesota, and was a farmer. Hughes served on the Blue Earth County Commission. He also served on the Cambria Township Board, as the Cambria Township Assessor and also served on the Cambria Township School Board. Hughes serve in the Minnesota House of Representatives from 1941 until his death in 1947.

References

1878 births
1947 deaths
People from Iowa
People from New Ulm, Minnesota
Farmers from Minnesota
School board members in Minnesota
County commissioners in Minnesota
Minnesota city council members
Members of the Minnesota House of Representatives